Ischnocnema guentheri is a species of frog in the family Brachycephalidae.
It is found in Argentina, Brazil, and possibly Paraguay.
Its natural habitats are subtropical or tropical moist lowland forest and subtropical or tropical moist montane forest.
It is threatened by habitat loss.

References

guentheri
Amphibians of Argentina
Amphibians of Brazil
Taxonomy articles created by Polbot
Amphibians described in 1864